The franc (ISO 4217 code is BIF) is the currency of Burundi. It is nominally subdivided into 100 centimes, although coins have never been issued in centimes since Burundi began issuing its own currency. Only during the period when Burundi used the Belgian Congo franc were centime coins issued.

History
The franc became the currency of Burundi in 1916, when Belgium occupied the former German colony and replaced the German East African rupie with the Belgian Congo franc. Burundi used the currency of Belgian Congo until 1960, when the Rwanda and Burundi franc was introduced. Burundi began issuing its own francs in 1964.

There were plans to introduce a common currency, a new East African shilling, for the five member states of the East African Community by the end of 2015. As of March 2023, these plans have not yet materialized.

Coins
In 1965, the Bank of the Kingdom of Burundi issued brass 1 franc coins. In 1968, Bank of the Republic of Burundi took over the issuance of coins and introduced aluminum 1 and 5 francs and cupro-nickel 10 francs. The 5 and 10 francs have continuous milled edges. Second types of the 1 and 5 franc coins were introduced in 1976, featuring the coat of arms. In 2011 new 10 and 50 franc coins were introduced.

Banknotes
From February 1964 until 31 December 1965, notes of the Banque d’Emission du Rwanda et du Burundi (Issuing Bank of Rwanda and Burundi), in denominations of 5, 10, 20, 50, 100, 500 and 1,000 francs, were overprinted with a diagonal hollow "BURUNDI" for use in the country. These were followed in 1964 and 1965 by regular issues in the same denominations by the Banque du Royaume du Burundi (Bank of the Kingdom of Burundi).

In 1966, notes for 20 francs and above were overprinted by the Bank of the Republic of Burundi, replacing the word "Kingdom" with "Republic". Regular issues of this bank began in denominations of 10, 20, 50, 100, 500, 1,000 and 5,000 francs. 10 francs were replaced by coins in 1968. 2,000 franc notes were introduced in 2001, followed by 10,000 francs in 2004. Photographer Kelly Fajack's image of school kids in Burundi was used on the back of the Burundian 10,000 franc note. In 2015 Burundi launched a new series of banknotes. The 10, 20, and 50 franc banknotes have lost their legal tender status and the 100 franc banknote is the only note from the old series in circulation.

Historical exchange rates
On 3 January 2006, the franc was valued at 925 per $1. On January 1, 2008, the franc was valued at 1,129.40 per US dollar. On January 1, 2009, the franc was valued at 1,234.33 per U.S. dollar. On 10 July, the franc was valued at 1,587.60 per US dollar.

See also
 Economy of Burundi
 Rwandan franc

References

External links

Currencies of Burundi
Currencies introduced in 1964